"I Can Make It Better" is a song by American recording artist Luther Vandross. It was released in 1996 as the second single from his tenth and platinum album, Your Secret Love (1996). The song reached number 15 on the US Billboard Hot R&B Singles chart and peaked in the top fifty on the UK Singles Chart. A music video was also produced to promote the single.

Critical reception
Larry Flick from Billboard declared the song as "an old-school soul ballad that reminds everyone why he is a truly untouchable stylist." He added, "In lesser hands, this song would reek of unprogrammable nostalgia. But Vandross cruises through the song with enticing and romantic flair, deftly swerving around an arrangement of strings and horns. A fine way to maintain the interest of R&B radio program- mers while possibly tweaking popsters who could certainly use a little more pure soul in their lives." A reviewer from Music Week rated the song three out of five, describing it as "a smooth ballad with uptempo touches from the king of lurve".

Track list
 US, UK CD single
"I Can Make It Better" (Single Edit) - 4:29
"I Can Make It Better" (Charles Roane Remix Edit) - 4:28
"I Can Make It Better" (Soulshock & Karlin Remix Edit) - 4:28
"A Kiss For Christmas" - 4:12
Note: "A Kiss for Christmas" is from the Vandross album This Is Christmas (1995)

Charts

References

External links
 www.luthervandross.com

1996 singles
1996 songs
Luther Vandross songs
Epic Records singles
Songs written by Luther Vandross
Songs written by Marcus Miller